The following is a timeline of the presidency of Donald Trump during the second quarter of 2018, from April 1 to June 30, 2018. To navigate among quarters, see timeline of the Donald Trump presidency.

Overview

Economy

More than 103,000 jobs were created in March as the unemployment rate remained stable into April. At the start of the quarter, the U.S. stock market experienced daily sell-offs and recoveries due to a burgeoning U.S.–China trade war and increased political scrutiny of American business icons Amazon and Facebook. In May, the U.S. Labor Department reported a seasonally adjusted unemployment rate of 3.9% for April and an increase of 164,000 jobs. Wages grew by 2.6%. Hiring gains were broad based with jobs being added in the fields of professional and business services, health care, manufacturing, and mining.

Public opinion

According to FiveThirtyEight, President Trump's approval rate at the beginning of this quarter was 40.5%, down 4.9% from the start of his presidency. By May 1, it had improved to 41.2%. For more polls, see 2018 opinion polling on the Donald Trump administration

Timeline

April 2018

May 2018

June 2018

See also
Presidential transition of Donald Trump
First 100 days of Donald Trump's presidency
List of executive actions by Donald Trump
List of presidential trips made by Donald Trump (international trips)

References

2018 Q2
Presidency of Donald Trump
April 2018 events in the United States
May 2018 events in the United States
June 2018 events in the United States
2018 timelines
Political timelines of the 2010s by year
Articles containing video clips